Alfonso Quaranta (2 January 1936 – 6 March 2023) was an Italian magistrate. He served as President of the Constitutional Court of Italy from 2011 to 2013.

Quaranta died in Rome on 6 March 2023, at the age of 87.

References

1936 births
2023 deaths
People from Naples
Judges of the Constitutional Court of Italy
Presidents of the Constitutional Court of Italy
Knights Grand Cross of the Order of Merit of the Italian Republic
Grand Officers of the Order of Merit of the Italian Republic